Tretower Castle is a Grade I-listed ruined castle in the village of Tretower in the county of Powys, Wales. It was built around the beginning of the twelfth century as a motte and bailey castle and this was probably replaced mid-century by a stone shell keep. The castle was enlarged in the early thirteenth century, but later fell into ruin.

History

Tretower was founded as a motte and bailey castle by Picard, a follower of Bernard de Neufmarché. Probably around 1150, Picard's son, Roger Picard I, replaced the motte with a shell keep. By about 1230 a tall cylindrical keep was added to the inside of the shell keep, possibly by his great-grandson, Roger Picard II, and the space between was roofed over. At this time the earlier bailey was walled in stone and provided with cylindrical corner towers. In the early 14th century residential buildings were constructed away from the original fortifications forming today's Tretower Court. Over time the lords of Tretower favoured the more luxurious Court and the castle fell into disuse.

Description of the castle

The castle is roughly triangular in plan, with the motte and keep assemblage occupying the western corner. The 12th century shell-keep is an irregular enclosure with a gate-tower on the line of approach from the bailey. In the centre of the shell stands the tall cylindrical 13th century keep. The keep is of three storeys, with an original entrance at first floor level, above a strong, slanted batter or talus. The top of the talus is marked by a decorative string-course of stone.

See also
 Castles in Great Britain and Ireland
 List of castles in Wales

References

Bibliography

External links

 Tretower Castle & Court – official site at Cadw
 Article and photos of the Tretower Castle & Court

Castles in Powys
Castle ruins in Wales
Towers in Wales
Cadw
Brecknockshire
Grade I listed castles in Wales
Grade I listed buildings in Powys
Scheduled monuments in Powys